is a private junior college in Saga, Saga, Japan.

History 
The history of the school began in 1897 when Yasu Nakajima (1876–1951) opened a private academy in her home. The private academy developed into Saga Girls' Sewing School in 1923, then into Saga Asahi Girl's High School in 1948. In 1966 the school foundation Asahi Gakuen established Saga Women's Junior College with the Department of Domestic Science.

Organization 
 Department of Child Studies
 Department of Health and Welfare
 Department of Career Design
 Advanced Course of Child Studies (1-year course)

References

External links 
 Official site 

Private universities and colleges in Japan
Japanese junior colleges
Universities and colleges in Saga Prefecture